José Ferreira Franco (18 November 1934 in Recife – 25 July 2009), nicknamed Zequinha, was a Brazilian association football player.

Playing career

National team
He earned 16 caps and scored 2 goals for the Brazil national football team. And he was also a part of the 1962 FIFA World Cup winning squad, although he did not play any matches during the tournament. He did though pick up a winners' medal at the tournament, being an unused substitute.

Professional
During his club career he played for Auto Esporte-PB in 1954, Santa Cruz-PE from 1954 to 1958. He then went to São Paulo club Palmeiras from 1958 to 1965. After this he went to rivals Fluminense for the 1965 season before returning to Palmeiras playing there until 1968.

After leaving Palmeiras, Zequinha went to Curitiba side Atlético-PR for whom he played for from 1968 until 1970. His last season in Brazil came with Náutico in 1970. 
He played for the Brazilian national team from 1960 to 1965. On 25 July 2009, Zequinha died at the age of 74.

Honours

Palmeiras
Campeonato Paulista
1959, 1963, 1966
Rio-São Paulo Tournament
1965
Campeonato Brasileiro Série A
[[1960 Campeonato Brasileiro Série A|1960]], 1967, 1967
Firenze Cup (Italy)
1963
João Havelange Cup
1966
Brazil-Japan Cup
1967

International
FIFA World Cup
1962
Copa Roca
1960, 1963
Pan American Games
1963'''

References

1934 births
2009 deaths
1962 FIFA World Cup players
Brazilian footballers
Brazil international footballers
Club Athletico Paranaense players
Clube Náutico Capibaribe players
FIFA World Cup-winning players
Fluminense FC players
Santa Cruz Futebol Clube players
Sociedade Esportiva Palmeiras players
Association football midfielders
Sportspeople from Recife